KCHR (1350 AM) was a radio station broadcasting an oldies format. Licensed to Charleston in the U.S. state of Missouri, the station was owned by South Missouri Broadcasting Company. Its license was cancelled January 21, 2020.

References

External links
FCC Station Search Details: DKCHR (Facility ID: 61145)
FCC History Cards for KCHR (covering 1952-1980)

CHR
Defunct radio stations in the United States
Radio stations disestablished in 2020
2020 disestablishments in Missouri
Radio stations established in 1953
1953 establishments in Missouri
CHR